The 2014 Men's Asian Games Volleyball Tournament was the 15th edition of the event, organized by the Asian governing body, the AVC. It was held in Incheon and Ansan, South Korea from 20 September to 3 October 2014.

Squads

Results
All times are Korea Standard Time (UTC+09:00)

Preliminary round

Group A

|}

Group B

|}

Group C

|}

Group D

|}

Play-off
 The results and the points of the matches between the same teams that were already played during the preliminary round shall be taken into account for the play-off.

Group E

|}

Group F

|}

Group G

|}

Group H

|}

Classification 13th–16th

Semifinals 13th–16th

|}

Classification 15th–16th

|}

Classification 13th–14th

|}

Classification 9th–12th

Semifinals 9th–12th

|}

Classification 11th–12th

|}

Classification 9th–10th

|}

Final round

Quarterfinals

|}

Semifinals 5th–8th

|}

Semifinals

|}

Classification 7th–8th

|}

Classification 5th–6th

|}

Bronze medal match

|}

Gold medal match

|}

Final standing

References
Results

External links
Official website

Men